Saw Ba Oo is a Burmese Lethwei fighter and mixed martial artist. He is signed to the World Lethwei Championship and ONE Championship's Lightweight division.

Lethwei record

|- style="background:#c5d2ea;"
| 2019-03-12 || Draw || align="left" | Tha Pyay Nyo || Lethwei Challenge Fights || Ye Township, Mon State, Myanmar || Draw || 5 || 3:00
|- style="background:#fbb;"
| 2019-02-22 || Loss || align="left" | Yan Naing Tun ||  WLC 7: Mighty Warriors || Mandalay, Myanmar || Decision (unanimous) || 5 || 3:00
|- style="background:#fbb;"
| 2019-02-04 || Loss || align="left" | Pakaw Dabphong || Myanmar vs. Thailand Challenge Fights || Hlaingbwe Township, Kayin State, Myanmar || KO || 4 || 
|- style="background:#fbb;"
| 2018-06-02 || Loss || align="left" | Artur Saladiak ||  WLC 5: Knockout War || Naypyidaw, Myanmar || KO || 4 || 1:00
|- style="background:#cfc;"
| 2018-02-17 || Win || align="left" | Tha Pyay Nyo ||  WLC 4: Bareknuckle-King || Naypyidaw, Myanmar || Decision (unanimous) || 5 || 3:00
|- style="background:#fbb;"
| 2017-03-03 || Loss || align="left" | Thway Thit Win Hlaing ||  WLC 1: The Great Beginning || Yangon, Myanmar || Decision (unanimous) || 5 || 3:00
|- style="background:#fbb;"
| 2015-04-11 || Loss || align="left" | Kyar Pauk ||  Thuwunna Stadium || Yangon, Myanmar || TKO || 4 || 
|-
| colspan=9 | Legend:

Mixed martial arts record

|-
|Loss
|align=center| 2–2
|Phoe Thaw
|Split decision
|ONE Championship: Hero's Dream
| 
|align=center|3
|align=center|5:00
|Yangon, Myanmar
|
|-
|Win
|align=center| 2–1
|Kyal Sin Phyo
|Decision (unanimous)
|ONE Championship: State of Warriors
| 
|align=center|3
|align=center|5:00
|Yangon, Myanmar
|
|-
|Loss
|align=center| 1–1
|Thway Thit Aung
|TKO(punches)
|ONE Championship: Kingdom of Warriors
| 
|align=center|1
|align=center|2:25
|Yangon, Myanmar
|
|-
|Win
|align=center| 1–0
|Dawna Aung
|TKO(punches)
|ONE Championship: Kingdom of Warriors
| 
|align=center|1
|align=center|4:03
|Yangon, Myanmar
|
|-

References

External links
 Saw Ba Oo Facebook Page

1991 births
Living people
Burmese male mixed martial artists
Mixed martial artists utilizing Lethwei
People from Kayin State
Burmese Lethwei practitioners